Alvin Fortes (born 25 April 1994) is a Cape Verdean footballer who plays as a right winger for Nongbua Pitchaya.

Club career
Born in Rotterdam, Fortes played for Sparta Rotterdam, UVS and Feyenoord's youth setups before joining SV Heinenoord in June 2013. However, in July, he was spotted by Nike Academy's program The Chance, and was assigned to their squad.

On 4 September 2013, Fortes signed his first pro deal, joining Finnish Kakkonen side Palloseura Kemi Kings. He appeared in six matches for the club, scoring once, as his side narrowly missed out promotion.

In March 2014, Fortes was about to join FC Dordrecht, being initially assigned to their youth setup, but the deal later collapsed. In August, he moved to RKC Waalwijk.

Fortes made his professional debut on 22 August 2014, coming on as a second half substitute in a 3–2 away win against FC Den Bosch for the Eerste Divisie championship. He scored his first goal on 17 October, netting the first in a 2–0 home win against SC Telstar.

On 10 December 2014, Fortes signed a two-and-a-half-year contract with Eredivisie side Vitesse Arnhem, but being assigned to the youth squad until the end of the campaign. Only two months later, his contract was rescinded.

International career
Fortes was born in the Netherlands and is of Cape Verdean descent and has expressed his willingness to represent Cape Verde internationally.

Fortes made his professional debut for the Cape Verde national football team in a friendly 3–2 win over Algeria on 1 June 2018.

References

External links
RKC official profile 

1994 births
Living people
Footballers from Rotterdam
Cape Verdean footballers
Cape Verde international footballers
Dutch footballers
Dutch expatriate footballers
Dutch sportspeople of Cape Verdean descent
Association football wingers
Nike Academy players
RKC Waalwijk players
FC Zbrojovka Brno players
SBV Vitesse players
TOP Oss players
Veria F.C. players
FC Dila Gori players
FC Kaisar players
Kakkonen players
Eerste Divisie players
Tweede Divisie players
TFF First League players
Erovnuli Liga players
Czech First League players
Kazakhstan Premier League players
Expatriate footballers in Finland
Expatriate footballers in Turkey
Expatriate footballers in Greece
Expatriate footballers in the Czech Republic
Expatriate footballers in Georgia (country)
Expatriate footballers in Kazakhstan
Dutch expatriate sportspeople in Finland
Dutch expatriate sportspeople in Turkey
Dutch expatriate sportspeople in Greece
Dutch expatriate sportspeople in the Czech Republic
Dutch expatriate sportspeople in Georgia (country)
Dutch expatriate sportspeople in Kazakhstan